The Syrian Resistance (al-Muqāwamat al-Sūriyah, Arabic: المقاومة السورية), formerly known as the Popular Front for the Liberation of the Sanjak of Iskandarun (Arabic: الجبهة الشعبية لتحرير لواء اســكندرون), is a pro-government Syrian armed militia group operating in northwest Syria, claiming a Marxist–Leninist ideology.

Background 
The movement is led by Mihrac Ural, a Turkish Alawite who has Syrian citizenship and is also known as "Ali Kayyali" (علي كيالي). According to Today's Zaman, Ural was the leader of a clandestine insurgent cell in Hatay Province called the People's Liberation Party-Front of Turkey or Acilciler (The Urgent Ones). Zaman further alleged that Ural's group has sought to agitate Hatay's sizable Alawite population into confrontation with the Turkish authorities and has also recruited local Alawites to fight in Syria on behalf of the Syrian government. The group claims to also have supporters among Syria's Sunni Muslims and Christians.

Though the group openly espouses a broadly-inclusive platform of Syrian nationalism in addition to secular leftism, it has been claimed that its primary focus is the defence of the Alawite and Twelver Shi’a religious minorities of Syria. The Syrian Resistance has been accused by the Syrian opposition of being a sectarian Alawite militia, and of having carried out bombings and attacks in Turkey and on villages in Syria. However, Sheikh Muwaffaq al-Ghazal, a member of the Islamic Alawi Council, claims it has an inclusive national line regarding religion, race and gender.

History 
Founded before the Syrian Civil War's outbreak under the name "Popular Front for the Liberation of the Sanjak of Iskandarun", the militia has been most active in Latakia Governorate, where its members reportedly committed a massacre in the town of Baniyas in 2013. The Turkish government has also suspected the Syrian Resistance of carrying out the Reyhanlı bombings.

On 29 March 2016, it was falsely reported that Mihraç Ural had been killed by Ahrar al-Sham.

In late July 2016, the Syrian Resistance sent reinforcement contingents from Hama to Aleppo in order to support the pro-government forces during the 2016 Aleppo campaign. In course of the campaign, they were deployed both in the northern city at the Castello road front, as well as in the south where rebel forces launched a counter-offensive.

At some point, the "Falcons of the Jazira and Euphrates", a militia of Deir ez-Zor Governorate natives, officially joined the Syrian Resistance, though it remained operationally fully autonomous. Under the Syrian Resistance's flag, this unit took part in the central Syria campaign of mid-2017.

Jamal Trabelsi, director of the Syrian Resistance's information office, was targeted by an improvised explosive device (IED) in Aleppo in July 2017, though he survived. The group accused "Turkey-backed & hired gangs" of being behind the attack. A few days later, a female media officer of the Syrian Resistance, Duaa Hayel Sulaiman, was assassinated in Damascus.

See also
List of armed groups in the Syrian Civil War

References

External links

 
THKP-C Acilciler blog

2011 establishments in Syria
Anti-ISIL factions in Syria
Communism in Syria
Communist militant groups
Leninism
Military units and formations established in 2011
Pro-government factions of the Syrian civil war
Syrian nationalism
Axis of Resistance